This is a list of Justices of the High Court of Justice of England and Wales, the puisne judges of the court. They serve in addition to the High Court's ex officio members:
 Lord Chief Justice
 President of the King's Bench Division
 President of the Family Division
 Chancellor of the High Court
 Senior Presiding Judge
 Vice-President of the King's Bench Division

In addition to the justices, Masters of the High Court (King's Bench Masters, Chancery Masters, Taxing Masters/Costs Judges) and Insolvency and Companies Court Judges also form part of the judiciary of the High Court. Decisions of justices, masters and of Insolvency and Companies Court Judges are of equal standing, both types being judges of the High Court sitting at first instance.

Within months of appointment, male justices are made knights bachelor, and female justices are made Dame Commanders of the British Empire (DBE). In addition, all High Court judges are entitled to the judicial style Mr/Mrs Justice X.

The number of Justices of the High Court is limited to 108, and the Public Service Pensions and Judicial Offices Act 2022 mandates that they retire at 75. Prior to 2022, the Judicial Pensions and Retirement Act 1993 mandated that they, along with other senior judges throughout the UK retire at 70 years of age. Judges appointed before 31 March 1995 were excepted and may wait to retire at 75. In 2020 the last such Judge remaining in the High Court is Mr Justice Holman. In the Supreme Court, Lady Arden was similarly exempted.  

List of current judges
As at 5 July 2022, there are 106 Justices of the High Court (16 Chancery Division, 19 Family Division, and 71 King's Bench Division judges), 73 male and 33 female.

 Former judges 

 Common Pleas Division (1875–81) 
The Common Pleas Division was one of the original divisions of the High Court. It was created in 1875 through the merger of the Court of Common Pleas into the High Court. The five existing Justices of the Common Pleas were transferred to the new Common Pleas Division, and retained their previous titles until they left office. The Common Pleas Division was merged into the King's Bench Division in 1881, and all of its remaining Justices were transferred to the latter.

The head of the Division was the Chief Justice of the Common Pleas; the post was abolished along with the Common Pleas Division in 1881, and its powers vested in the Lord Chief Justice.

 Exchequer Division (1875–81) 
The Exchequer Division' was one of the original divisions of the High Court. It was created in 1875 through the merger of the Court of Exchequer into the High Court. The six existing Barons of the Exchequer were transferred to the new Exchequer Division, and retained their previous titles until they left office. Sir Henry Hawkins, the first judge to be directly appointed to the Exchequer Division, tried in vain to obtain the title of Baron, but was styled a Judge of the High Court instead. The Exchequer Division was merged into the King's Bench Division in 1881, and all of its remaining Justices were transferred to the latter.

The head of the Division was the Chief Baron of the Exchequer; the post was abolished along with the Exchequer Division in 1881, and its powers vested in the Lord Chief Justice.

See also
Justice of the Supreme Court of the United Kingdom
List of Lords Justices of Appeal
Senator of the College of Justice
:Category:English judges
:Category:Welsh judges
:Category:High Court judges (England and Wales)

Notes

References

High Court judges of England and Wales